Jaziel Ismael Martínez Huerta (born 3 October 2000) is a Mexican professional footballer who plays as an attacking midfielder for La Liga club RealMadrid, on loan from Monterrey.

Career statistics

Club

Honours
Monterrey
CONCACAF Champions League: 2021

References

External links
 
 
 

Living people
2000 births
Mexican footballers
Association football midfielders
Liga de Expansión MX players
Liga MX players
C.F. Monterrey players
Raya2 Expansión players
Footballers from Coahuila
Sportspeople from Saltillo